Here We Come  may refer to:

 Here We Come (A1 album), 1999
 Here We Come (The Three Sounds album), 1960
 "Here We Come" (song), 1998 single by Timbaland
 "Here We Come", a song on the album Irv Gotti Presents: The Inc.